The Central Leading Group for Propaganda and Ideological Work is the agency under the Politburo of the Chinese Communist Party (CCP) responsible for nationwide propaganda and information.

Its current group leader is Wang Huning; with Sun Chunlan and Huang Kunming as deputies.

Functions and duties 
The CLGPIW controls all propaganda, publicity and information of the Chinese Communist Party as well as the People's Republic of China. The agencies under its scrutiny include the CCP Propaganda Department and the State Council Information Office. Its basic function is to coordinate ideological, propaganda, cultural, media and publishing activities. In both composition and duties, the CLGPIW overlap another similar body, the CCP Central Guidance Commission for Building Spiritual Civilization.

The group leader is usually the Politburo Standing Committee member in charge of propaganda, while the deputy leader is the head of the Propaganda Department. The rest of the group members (usually five to eight), except for the head and deputy head of the Secretarial Group, seem to be unknown to the public.

History
The CLGPIW was established in the summer of 1957 as the Central Theory Group (中央理论小组; Zhōngyāng Lǐlùn Xiǎozǔ) led by Kang Sheng, but it was replaced on June 10, 1958, by a Central Culture and Education Group (中央文教小组; Zhōngyāng Wénjiào Xiǎozǔ) led by Lu Dingyi, with Kang Sheng as deputy leader and Chen Boda among its members, until a separate leading group for education was established in 1982. The current CLGPIW was established in 1988 by the CCP Central Committee Directive No. 11.

Its first leader was Hu Qili, although he was dismissed in 1989 for opposing the use of violence against the 1989 Tiananmen Square protests and massacre. Although usually the group leader is a Politburo Standing Committee member, Ding Guangen, who led the CLGPIW from 1992 to 2002, was concurrently Standing Committee member, Secretariat member and Propaganda Department head.

List of group leaders 
 Hu Qiaomu (1982–1987)
 Hu Qili (1987–1989)
 Li Ruihuan (1989–1992)
 Ding Guangen (1992–2002)
 Li Changchun (2002–2013)
 Liu Yunshan (2013–2017)
 Wang Huning (2017–present)

References 

Chinese propaganda organisations
Politburo of the Chinese Communist Party
Leading groups of the Chinese Communist Party